is a city in the western side of Tokyo Metropolis, Japan.

Geography
Chōfu is approximately in the south-center of Tokyo Metropolis, approximately 20 kilometers west from downtown Tokyo, on the Musashino Terrace bordered by the floodplains of the Tama River and the Iruma River.

Surrounding municipalities
Tokyo Metropolis
Setagaya
Mitaka
Fuchū
Koganei
Komae
Inagi
Kanagawa Prefecture
Kawasaki

Climate
Chōfu has a Humid subtropical climate (Köppen Cfa) characterized by warm summers and cool winters with light to no snowfall.  The average annual temperature in Chōfu is 14.5 °C. The average annual rainfall is 1647 mm with September as the wettest month. The temperatures are highest on average in August, at around 26.0 °C, and lowest in January, at around 3.1 °C.

Demographics
Per Japanese census data, the population of Chōfu has grown steadily over the past century, and increased especially rapidly in the 1950s and 1960s.

History
The area of present-day Chōfu has been inhabited since Japanese Paleolithic times, and numerous remains from the Jōmon, Yayoi and Kofun periods have been discovered. During the Nara period, it became part of ancient Musashi Province. During the Sengoku period, the area was frequently contested between the Later Hōjō clan and Uesugi clan. During the Edo period, the area prospered as a post station on the Kōshū Kaidō and as a center for sericulture. The origin of the city name "Chōfu" comes from the fact that it was allowed to pay taxes in cloth instead of in rice.

In the post-Meiji Restoration cadastral reform of April 1, 1889, Chōfu Town and neighboring Jindai Village were established within Kanagawa Prefecture. The entire district was transferred to the control of Tokyo Metropolis on April 1, 1893. Jindai was elevated to town status on November 3, 1952, and merged with Chōfu Town on April 1, 1955, to form the present city of Chōfu.

Government
Chōfu has a mayor-council form of government with a directly elected mayor and a unicameral city council of 28 members. Chōfu, together with the city of Komae, contributes three members to the Tokyo Metropolitan Assembly. In terms of national politics, the city is part of Tokyo 22nd district of the lower house of the Diet of Japan.

Economy
Chōfu is primarily a regional commercial center, and a bedroom community ("bed town" ベッドタウン, beddotaun) for central Tokyo. The headquarters of the Japan Aerospace Exploration Agency (JAXA) are also located in the city.

Transportation

Railway
 Keio Corporation  - Keiō Line
  –  –  –  –  –  –  – 
 Keio Corporation  - Keiō Sagamihara Line
  –

Highway
   Chūō Expressway
 ( Kōshū Kaidō )

Airport
Chofu Airport - domestic flights to Izu Islands.

Education 
Colleges and universities:
University of Electro-Communications
Tokyo University of Foreign Studies
Toho Gakuen School of Music
Shirayuri Women's University
Jikei University School of Medicine

Primary and secondary education
 Chōfu has 20 public elementary schools and eight public junior high schools operated by the city government and two private elementary schools and three private middle schools. The city has four public high schools operated by the Tokyo Metropolitan Board of Education and three private high schools.

Metropolitan high schools:
 
 
 
 

Municipal junior high schools:
 Chofu Junior High School (調布中学校)
 Jindai Junior High School (神代中学校)
 No. 3 Junior High School (第三中学校)
 No. 4 Junior High School (第四中学校)
 No. 5 Junior High School (第五中学校)
 No. 6 Junior High School (第六中学校)
 No. 7 Junior High School (第七中学校)
 No. 8 Junior High School (第八中学校)

Municipal elementary schools:
 No. 1 Elementary School (第一小学校)
 No. 2 Elementary School (第二小学校)
 No. 3 Elementary School (第三小学校)
 Chowa Elementary School (調和小学校)
 Fuda Elementary School (布田小学校)
 Fujimidai Elementary School (富士見台小学校)
 Ishiwara Elementary School (石原小学校)
 Jindaiji Elementary School (深大寺小学校)
 Kashiwano Elementary School (柏野小学校)
 Kitanodai Elementary School (北ノ台小学校)
 Kokuryo Elementary School (国領小学校)
 Midorigaoka Elementary School (緑ヶ丘小学校)
 Somechi Elementary School (染地小学校)
 Sugimori Elementary School (杉森小学校)
 Takizaka Elementary School (滝坂小学校)
 Tamagawa Elementary School (多摩川小学校)
 Tobitakyu Elementary School (飛田給小学校)
 Uenohara Elementary School (上ノ原小学校)
 Wakaba Elementary School (若葉小学校)
 Yakumodai Elementary School (八雲台小学校)

Private schools:
The American School in Japan, an international school, also has a campus.

Local attractions

Jindai Botanical Garden
Jindai Temple - famous for many soba noodle restaurants around the temple.
Nogawa Park
Sengawa Theater
Tokyo Stadium (commonly known as Ajinomoto Stadium) in Chōfu hosts soccer games for two J.League teams: FC Tokyo and Tokyo Verdy.

The Chōfu City Fireworks Festival, attended by as many as 300,000 people along the banks of the Tamagawa River.

Chōfu has a large cultural centre that supports many groups encouraging the integration of foreigners into Japanese society, providing free Japanese, Shodo, Ikebana, Karate (and many other) lessons.

There is a park and memorial hall commemorating the life of novelist Mushanokōji Saneatsu, a former resident of Chōfu.

For the 1964 Summer Olympics, the city served as part of the route for the athletic 50-kilometer walk and marathon events.

Notable people from Chōfu 

Kondō Isami, Bakumatsu period samurai, born in the village of Kami-Ishihara in Musashi Province, now modern Chōfu
Shigeru Mizuki, cartoonist, born in Sakaiminato, Tottori but lived in Chofu for roughly 50 years
Saneatsu Mushanokōji, novelist, playwright, poet
Shutaro Oku, director
Junji Takada, actor
Miho Yamada, former rhythmic gymnast

References

External links

Chōfu City Official Website 

 
Venues of the 1964 Summer Olympics
Cities in Tokyo
Western Tokyo